Teemu Kesä (born June 7, 1981) is a Finnish former professional ice hockey defenceman. He last played for Malmö Redhawks of the Swedish Allsvenskan. He was selected by the New Jersey Devils in the 4th round (100th overall) of the 1999 NHL Entry Draft.

References

External links

Living people
Ilves players
1981 births
New Jersey Devils draft picks
Finnish ice hockey defencemen
Ice hockey people from Helsinki
21st-century Finnish people